White River is a river, approximately  long, in the U.S. states of Colorado and Utah and is a tributary of the Green River (which flows into the Colorado River).

Description
The river rises in two forks in northwestern Colorado in northeastern Garfield County in the Flat Tops Wilderness Area in the White River National Forest. The North Fork rises in Wall Lake and flows northwest, then southwest. The South Fork rises ten miles south of the north, flows southwest, then northwest, past Spring Cave. The two forks join near Buford in eastern Rio Blanco County, forming the White. It flows west, then northwest, past Meeker (site of the White River Museum), and across the broad valley between the Danforth Hills on the north and the Roan Plateau on the south. Downstream from Meeker, it is joined by Piceance Creek and Yellow Creek.

The White River is navigable by small boats throughout most of its length. But in low water years, the water level may be too low for navigation for a period of several months.

Dams and reservoirs
The river is dammed in two places, both in Colorado. Taylor Draw Dam creates Kenney Reservoir near Rangely, and the Johnnie Johnson Dam impounds Rio Blanco Lake near White River City.

Climate
According to the Köppen climate classification system, White River has a semi-arid climate, abbreviated "BSk" on climate maps.

See also

 List of rivers of Colorado
 List of rivers of Utah
 List of tributaries of the Colorado River

References

External links

Rivers of Colorado
Rivers of Utah
Tributaries of the Green River (Colorado River tributary)
Rivers of Garfield County, Colorado
Rivers of Rio Blanco County, Colorado
Rivers of Uintah County, Utah
Tributaries of the Colorado River in Colorado
Tributaries of the Colorado River in Utah